Benjamin Peyton Cornelius (November 9, 1850 – December 24, 1930) was an American politician and judge in Oregon. A Republican, he served in the Oregon House of Representatives and as the mayor of Hillsboro, Oregon. The son of Thomas R. Cornelius, he was also the sheriff of Washington County and a judge in that county.

Early life
Cornelius was born to Thomas Cornelius and Florentine Wilks on November 9, 1850, in Hillsboro, Washington County, Oregon. He was raised in that county and was engaged in agriculture before marrying Esther A. Barrett on November 11, 1871, in neighboring Glencoe. Cornelius became involved in politics as a Republican and served as a delegate to the county's party convention and state conventions starting in the 1880s.

Political career
In 1884, Cornelius won his first election when he was elected as the sheriff of Washington County. He was elected again in 1888, and in 1894 was elected as a county judge. In 1892, Cornelius entered state politics and was elected to a two-year term in the Oregon House of Representatives as a Republican representing Washington County.

Following his term as county judge he returned to farming before winning election as mayor of Hillsboro in 1903. The seventeenth person to serve as mayor of Washington County's seat, he was in office from December 15, 1903, until December 4, 1906.  Cornelius returned to the Oregon House in 1917 after winning election in 1916, again representing Washington County. Benjamin P. Cornelius died on December 24, 1930, at the age of 80 and was buried at the cemetery at the Old Scotch Church north of Hillsboro.

References

Republican Party members of the Oregon House of Representatives
Mayors of Hillsboro, Oregon
Oregon sheriffs
1850 births
1930 deaths
Burials in Oregon
County judges in Oregon